Jean-Pierre du Teil, baron du Teil, seigneur de Pommier, Chars, les Rousselières, Vaux and of other places (15 July 1722 – 22 February 1794) was a French artillery general and one of the most important influences on Napoleon I during his training at the École d'artillerie in Auxonne (set up in 1759).

Life
The son of the artillery officer François du Teil (1704–1758), knight of the order of Saint-Louis, and of Marguerite de Chambaran (died 1758), du Teil was born at château de Pommier, La Côte-Saint-André, and was the elder brother of the artillery theorist Jean du Teil.  Jean-Pierre was firstly a colonel du régiment de la Fère-Artillerie (1777), then the commandant of the École militaire at Auxonne (1779) and then an infantry brigadier (1780). In 1783, he was made military governor of Auxonne and was the following year promoted to maréchal de camp.  At the end of 1791, he was promoted to lieutenant général and inspector general of artillery.

In February 1794, he was arrested as a suspect and as a royalist by the military commission at Lyon, who condemned him to death.  As a serving military officer, he was shot by firing squad rather than guillotined.  However, Napoléon later gave 100,000 francs to the son or grandson of the baron du Teil in his memory.

1722 births
1794 deaths
People from Isère
French generals
French Army officers
French counter-revolutionaries
People executed by France by firing squad
Executed French people
People executed by the French First Republic
Executed people from Rhône-Alpes
People executed during the French Revolution